The 2022 United States House of Representatives elections in Ohio were held on November 8, 2022, to elect the 15 U.S. representatives from Ohio, one from each of the state's 15 congressional districts. The elections coincided with other elections to the House of Representatives, other elections to the United States Senate, and various state and local elections. Primary elections took place on May 3.

Results summary

Statewide

District
Results of the 2022 United States House of Representatives elections in Ohio by district:

District 1

The 1st district is based in the city of Cincinnati, stretching northward to Warren County. The incumbent is Republican Steve Chabot, who was re-elected with 51.8% of the vote in 2020.

This district was included on the list of Republican-held seats the Democratic Congressional Campaign Committee targeted in 2022. Democrat Greg Landsman won the election by a 5.6% margin.

Republican primary

Candidates

Nominee
Steve Chabot, incumbent U.S. Representative

Withdrawn
Brent Centers, Mayor of Franklin
Jenn Giroux, Christian activist

Endorsements

Results

Democratic primary

Candidates

Nominee
Greg Landsman, Cincinnati city councilor

Declined
Gavi Begtrup, small business owner, former policy advisor for U.S. Representative Gabby Giffords, and candidate for Mayor of Cincinnati in 2021 (running for state representative)
Kate Schroder, health care executive and nominee for this district in 2020

Endorsements

Results

General election

Predictions

Polling

Generic Republican vs. generic Democrat

Results

District 2

The 2nd district takes eastern Cincinnati and its suburbs, including Norwood and Loveland, and stretches eastward along the Ohio River. The incumbent is Republican Brad Wenstrup, who was re-elected with 61.1% of the vote in 2020. He was re-elected in 2022.

Republican primary

Candidates

Nominee
Brad Wenstrup, incumbent U.S. Representative

Eliminated in primary
James J. Condit, Jr., perennial candidate
David J. Windisch

Endorsements

Results

Democratic primary

Candidates

Nominee
Samantha Meadows, EMT

Eliminated in primary
Alan Darnowsky, former vice president of CitiBank and candidate for state representative in 2020

Results

General election

Predictions

Results

District 3

The 3rd district, located entirely within the borders of Franklin County, taking in inner Columbus, Bexley, Whitehall, as well as Franklin County's share of Reynoldsburg. The incumbent is Democrat Joyce Beatty, who was re-elected with 70.8% of the vote in 2020. She was re-elected in 2022.

Democratic primary

Candidates

Nominee
Joyce Beatty, incumbent U.S. Representative

Withdrawn
Matthew Meade

Endorsements

Results

Republican primary

Candidates

Nominee
Lee Stahley, professor and Whitehall city councilor

Results

General election

Predictions

Results

District 4

The 4th district, sprawls from the Columbus exurbs, including Marion and Lima into north-central Ohio, taking in Mansfield. The incumbent is Republican Jim Jordan, who was re-elected with 67.9% of the vote in 2020. He was re-elected in 2022.

Republican primary

Candidates

Nominee
Jim Jordan, incumbent U.S Representative

Endorsements

Results

Democratic primary

Candidates

Nominee
Tamie Wilson, entrepreneur

Eliminated in primary
Jeffrey Sites, U.S. Army veteran and candidate in 2020

Endorsements

Results

General election

Predictions

Results

District 5

The 5th district encompasses the lower portion of Northwestern Ohio and the middle shore of Lake Erie, taking in Findlay, Lorain, Oberlin, and Bowling Green. The incumbent is Republican Bob Latta, who was re-elected with 68.0% of the vote in 2020. He was re-elected in 2022.

Republican primary

Candidates

Nominee
Bob Latta, incumbent U.S. Representative

Endorsements

Results

Democratic primary

Candidates

Nominee
Craig Swartz, chair of the Wyandot County Democratic Party

Eliminated in primary
Martin Heberling, Amherst city councilor

Results

General election

Predictions

Results

District 6

The 6th district encompasses Appalachian Ohio and the Mahoning Valley, including Youngstown, Steubenville, and Marietta. The incumbent is Republican Bill Johnson, who was re-elected with 74.4% in 2020. Some parts of the 6th district, including Youngstown, were formerly in the 13th district before redistricting. He was re-elected in 2022.

Republican primary

Candidates

Nominee
Bill Johnson, incumbent U.S. Representative

Eliminated in primary
John Anderson
Michael Morgenstern, U.S. Marine Corps Veteran 
Gregory Zelenitz

Endorsements

Results

Democratic primary

Candidates

Nominee
Louis Lyras, Businessman

Eliminated in primary
Martin Alexander
Eric Scott Jones, data scientist
Shawna Roberts

Declined
John Boccieri, former U.S. Representative for Ohio's 16th congressional district, former state senator, and former state representative
Capri Cafaro, former Minority Leader of the Ohio Senate
Lou Gentile, former state senator
Sean O'Brien, former state senator and former state representative
Tim Ryan, incumbent U.S. Representative (running for U.S. Senate)
Anthony Traficanti, Mahoning County Commissioner

Results

General election

Predictions

Results

District 7

The 7th district stretches from exurban Cleveland to rural areas in north central Ohio, including Medina and Wooster. The incumbents are Republicans Bob Gibbs and Anthony Gonzalez, both of whom are retiring. Max Miller won the election.

Republican primary

Candidates

Nominee
Max Miller, former White House aide

Eliminated in primary
Anthony Leon Alexander, podcaster
Charlie Gaddis, business owner
Jonah Schulz, non-profit founder

Withdrawn
Bob Gibbs, incumbent U.S. Representative
Matt Shoemaker, former Intelligence Officer

Declined
Anthony Gonzalez, incumbent U.S. Representative

Endorsements

Results

Democratic primary

Candidates

Nominee
Matthew Diemer, podcast producer

Eliminated in primary
Tristan Rader, Lakewood city councilor

Withdrawn
Patrick A. Malley

Endorsements

Results

Independents
 Brian Kenderes (write-in) 
 Vince Licursi (write-in)

Filed paperwork
Lynn Carol Gorman, minister

General election

Predictions

Results

District 8

The 8th district takes in the northern and western suburbs of Cincinnati, including Butler County. The incumbent is Republican Warren Davidson, who was re-elected with 69.0% of the vote in 2020. He was re-elected in 2022.

Republican primary

Candidates

Nominee
Warren Davidson, incumbent U.S. Representative

Eliminated in primary
Phil Heimlich, former Cincinnati city councilman

Results

Democratic primary

Candidates

Nominee
Vanessa Enoch, former journalist

Results

General election

Predictions

Results

District 9

The 9th district is based in Northwest Ohio, including Toledo and the western Lake Erie coast. The incumbent is Democrat Marcy Kaptur, who was re-elected with 63.1% of the vote in 2020. She is running for re-election.

This district is included on the list of Democratic-held seats the National Republican Congressional Committee is targeting in 2022. The seat was significantly changed due to redistricting, losing all of its territory in Lorain and Cuyahoga counties while picking up more territory in northwest Ohio. This turned the district from a safely Democratic seat to a competitive one. 

Kaptur was re-elected in 2022.

Democratic primary

Candidates

Nominee
Marcy Kaptur, incumbent U.S. Representative

Endorsements

Results

Republican primary

Candidates

Nominee
J.R. Majewski, U.S. Air Force veteran and rapper

Eliminated in primary
Beth Deck
Theresa Gavarone, state senator from the 2nd district and former state representative from the 3rd district
Craig Riedel, state representative from the 82nd district

Withdrawn
Madison Gesiotto, 2014 Miss Ohio USA, political commentator, and lawyer (running in the 13th district)

Endorsements

Results

Independents

Filed paperwork
Youseff Baddar, teacher and activist

General election
J.R. Majewski ran on his military experience, claiming to have been a combat veteran deployed to Afghanistan. A public records request by the Associated Press showed that Majewski worked for six months loading planes in Qatar but did not receive any medals given to those who served in Afghanistan, and the campaign did not confirm if he was ever there.

Endorsements

Predictions

Polling

Results

District 10

The 10th district encompasses the Dayton metro area, including Dayton and the surrounding suburbs, as well as Springfield. The incumbent is Republican Mike Turner, who was re-elected with 58.4% of the vote in 2020. He was re-elected in 2022.

Republican primary

Candidates

Nominee
Mike Turner, incumbent U.S. Representative

Endorsements

Results

Democratic primary

Candidates

Nominee
David Esrati, Veteran

Eliminated in primary
Kirk Benjamin
Jeff Hardenbrook
Baxter Stapleton, filmmaker

Results

General election

Predictions

Results

District 11

The 11th district takes in Cleveland and its inner suburbs, including Euclid, Cleveland Heights, and Warrensville Heights. The incumbent is Democrat Shontel Brown, who was elected with 78.8% of the vote in a 2021 special election after the previous incumbent, Marcia Fudge was appointed as the United States Secretary of Housing and Urban Development.

The Democratic primary was low-profile, especially in contrast to the highly contentious 2021 special election.

The Congressional Progressive Caucus supported Nina Turner in the Democratic primary for Ohio's 11th congressional district special election in 2021 but switched its endorsement for the 2022 Democratic primary. 

Brown was re-elected in 2022.

Democratic primary

Candidates

Nominee
Shontel Brown, incumbent U.S. Representative

Eliminated in primary
Nina Turner, president of Our Revolution, former state senator for the 25th district, former Cleveland city councilor, national co-chair of the 2016 and 2020 Bernie Sanders presidential campaigns, and candidate for this seat in 2021

Endorsements

Results

Republican primary

Candidates

Nominee
Eric J. Brewer, former Mayor of East Cleveland and candidate for Mayor of Cleveland in 2017

Eliminated in primary
James Hemphill

Results

General election

Predictions

Results

District 12

The 12th district encompasses area of Ohio east of the Columbus metro area, taking in Newark, and Zanesville, as well as Athens. The incumbent is Republican Troy Balderson, who was re-elected with 55.2% of the vote in 2020. He was re-elected in 2022.

Republican primary

Candidates

Nominee
Troy Balderson, incumbent U.S. Representative

Eliminated in primary
Brandon Michael Lape

Results

Democratic primary

Candidates

Nominee
Amy Rippel-Elton

Eliminated in primary
Michael Fletcher

Withdrawn
Alaina Shearer, businesswoman and nominee for this seat in 2020

Results

General election

Predictions

Results

District 13

The 13th district includes most of the Akron - Canton population corridor. The incumbent is Democrat Tim Ryan, who was re-elected with 52.5% in 2020. On April 26, 2021, Ryan announced that he would seek the U.S. Senate seat being vacated by two-term Senator Rob Portman.

This district is included on the list of Democratic-held seats the National Republican Congressional Committee is targeting in 2022. The seat was altered significantly due to redistricting, now including all of Summit County and switching out parts of the Mahoning Valley for Canton. Despite this, it remains a Democratic leaning swing seat. Sykes won the election in 2022.

Democratic primary

Candidates

Nominee
Emilia Sykes, state representative from 34th district and former House Minority Leader

Declined
Tim Ryan, incumbent U.S. Representative (running for U.S. Senate)

Endorsements

Results

Republican primary

Candidates

Nominee
Madison Gesiotto Gilbert, 2014 Miss Ohio USA, political commentator, and lawyer

Eliminated in primary
Shay Hawkins, leader of the Opportunity Funds Association and former aide to U.S. Senator Tim Scott
Santana F. King
Janet Porter, anti-abortion activist and author
Dante N. Sabatucci
Ryan Saylor
Greg Wheeler, attorney

Endorsements

Polling

Results

General election

Predictions

Polling
Graphical summary

Generic Democrat vs. generic Republican

Results 
Despite many election forecasters stating Republicans were slightly favored to flip it, Sykes held the district and defeated Gesiotto Gilbert by 5 percentage points. Had the map been enacted in time for the 2020 presidential election, Joe Biden would have carried the district by 3 percentage points.

District 14

The 14th district is located in Northeast Ohio, taking in the eastern suburbs and exurbs of Cleveland, including Mayfield Heights, Solon, Parma, and Independence, as well as Ashtabula, Lake, Geauga, and Portage County. The incumbent is Republican David Joyce, who was re-elected with 60.1% of the vote in 2020. He was re-elected in 2022.

Republican primary

Candidates

Nominee
David Joyce, incumbent U.S. Representative

Eliminated in primary
Patrick Awtrey, businessman
Bevin Cormack, insurance agent

Endorsements

Results

Democratic primary

Candidates

Nominee
Matt Kilboy, Consultant, Nurse, Veteran

Results

General election

Predictions

Results

District 15

The 15th district encompasses the southwestern Columbus metro area, taking in the western, southern, and some northern suburbs of Columbus, including Dublin, Hilliard, and Grove City. The incumbent is Republican Mike Carey, who was elected with 58.3% of the vote in a 2021 special election after the previous incumbent, Steve Stivers, resigned to take a job as president and CEO of the Ohio Chamber of Commerce. He was re-elected in 2022.

Republican primary

Candidates

Nominee
Mike Carey, incumbent U.S. Representative

Endorsements

Results

Democratic primary

Nominee
Gary Josephson, activist

Withdrawn

Results

General election

Predictions

Results

Notes

Partisan clients

References

External links
 Ohio Secretary of State

Official campaign websites for 1st district candidates
 Steve Chabot (R) for Congress
 Greg Landsman (D) for Congress

Official campaign websites for 2nd district candidates
 Samantha Meadows (D) for Congress
 Brad Wenstrup (R) for Congress

Official campaign websites for 3rd district candidates
 Joyce Beatty (D) for Congress
 Lee Stahley (R) for Congress

Official campaign websites for 4th district candidates
 Jim Jordan (R) for Congress
 Tamie Wilson (D) for Congress

Official campaign websites for 5th district candidates
 Bob Latta (R) for Congress
 Craig Swartz (D) for Congress

Official campaign websites for 6th district candidates
 Bill Johnson (R) for Congress
 Louis Lyras (D) for Congress

Official campaign websites for 7th district candidates
 Matthew Diemer (D) for Congress
 Max Miller (R) for Congress

Official campaign websites for 8th district candidates
 Warren Davidson (R) for Congress
 Vanessa Enoch (D) for Congress

Official campaign websites for 9th district candidates
 Marcy Kaptur (D) for Congress
 J.R. Majewski (R) for Congress

Official campaign websites for 10th district candidates
 David Esrati (D) for Congress
 Mike Turner (R) for Congress

Official campaign websites for 11th district candidates
 Shontel Brown (D) for Congress

Official campaign websites for 12th district candidates
 Troy Balderson (R) for Congress

Official campaign websites for 13th district candidates
 Madison Gesiotto Gilbert (R) for Congress
 Emilia Sykes (D) for Congress

Official campaign websites for 14th district candidates
 David Joyce (R) for Congress
 Matt Kilboy (D) for Congress

Official campaign websites for 15th district candidates
 Mike Carey (R) for Congress
 Gary Josephson (D) for Congress

2022
Ohio
United States House of Representatives